German submarine U-1054 was a Type VIIC U-boat of Nazi Germany's Kriegsmarine during World War II.

Construction 
U-1054 was laid down on 30 March 1943 at the F. Krupp Germaniawerft AG yard in Kiel, Germany. She was launched on 24 February 1944 and commissioned on 25 March 1944 under the command of Oberleutnant zur See Wolfgang Riekeberg.

She was assessed at  submerged. She had two shafts and two  propellers.

The submarine was fitted with five  torpedo tubes (four fitted at the bow and one at the stern), fourteen torpedoes, one  deck gun (220 rounds), one  Flak M42 and two twin  C/30 anti-aircraft guns. The boat had a complement of 44 to 57 men.

Service history
U-1054 was used as a Training ship in the 5th U-boat Flotilla from 25 March 1944 until 16 September 1944, she was fitted with a Schnorchel underwater-breathing apparatus in March 1944.

Accident and disposal 
The submarine was towed to Kiel, where repairs were attempted from 22 August until 15 September 1944. On 16 September 1944, the submarine was decommissioned. She was originally going to be used for detonation tests, but instead remained in Kiel and was scrapped by British forces in May 1945.

References

Bibliography

German Type VIIC submarines
U-boats commissioned in 1944
World War II submarines of Germany
Ships built in Kiel
1944 ships
Maritime incidents in August 1944